Mount Myra is a mountain on Vancouver Island, British Columbia, Canada, located  southeast of Gold River and  south of Mount McBride.

See also 
 List of mountains of Canada

References 

Vancouver Island Ranges
One-thousanders of British Columbia
Clayoquot Land District